Turtles All the Way Down may refer to:

 "Turtles all the way down", an expression of the infinite regress problem
 "Turtles All the Way Down" (Awake), the thirteenth and final episode of the American television police procedural fantasy drama Awake
 Turtles All the Way Down (novel), a 2017 novel by John Green
 Turtles All the Way Down (film), an upcoming film based on the novel
 "Turtles All the Way Down" (song), a 2014 song by American country music artist Sturgill Simpson
 "Turtles All The Way Down", a 2009 song by metalcore band Every Time I Die on the album New Junk Aesthetic